Bobby Mills may refer to:

 Bobby Mills (athlete) (1894–1964), British long-distance runner
 Bobby Mills (footballer, born 1955), English former footballer
 Bobby Mills (Australian footballer) (1909–1978), Australian rules footballer
 Bobby 'The Ball Kicker' Mills (Kickerball Commercial Character), Kickerball Expert (Of Recent Years)

 Bobby Mills (English footballer, born 2000)

See also
 Robert Mills (disambiguation)